US-KMO,  is a series of Russian, previously Soviet, satellites which are used to identify ballistic missile launches. They provide early warning of missile attack and give information for the Moscow A-135 anti-ballistic missile system. They were run by the Russian Space Forces and it was succeeded by the Aerospace Defence Forces.

These satellites are part of the Oko programme and are in geosynchronous orbit 35,750 km above the Earth's equator. This means that they are always in the same place with the same field of view. Western locations give Russia coverage of missile launches in the United States whereas more eastern ones give coverage of China and the Middle East. They complement ground-based early warning radars and the US-K satellites which are in molniya orbits.

The first prototype satellite was launched on 8 October 1975, atop a Proton-K/DM-2 carrier rocket from Baikonur Cosmodrome. The most recent, and last of the series, was launched on 30 March 2012. As of December 2015, the entire Oko programme is being replaced by the new EKS system.

Technical information
US-KMO satellites were built by NPO Lavochkin. They feature a 1-metre diameter infrared telescope with a 4.5 metre hood which identifies missiles by their exhausts. They have an operational life of 5 to 7 years, although actual performance has been variable.

The satellites have the GRAU index 71Kh6.

The Oko western control centre is at Serpukhov-15, Moscow Oblast although Podvig notes  that satellites in the 3 easternmost positions would be out of range of this centre, and would be controlled by the eastern control centre at Pivan-1, Khabarovsk Krai.

Naming

These satellites have been mistakenly described as Prognoz (unrelated to the earlier Prognoz SO-M programme) as the positions they occupy are reserved with the ITU under the codename Prognoz.

Satellites

See also
US-KS
US-K
Defense Support Program, a similar United States system
EKS, the new system replacing the entire Oko programme.

Notes

References

Oko
Military satellites
Military satellites of Russia